Haemaphysalis minuta, is a hard-bodied tick of the genus Haemaphysalis. It is found in India and Sri Lanka. It is an obligate ectoparasite of mammals. It is a potential vector of Kyasanur Forest disease virus.

References

External links
A guide to the identification of all stages of the Haemaphysalis ticks of South India

Ticks
Ixodidae
Animals described in 1950